Ezra Samsora Morris, better known as Samsora, is an American former professional Super Smash Bros. player from New Orleans, United States.

In Super Smash Bros. for Wii U he had a number of strong performances but no major tournament victories and was ranked as the game's 22nd-best player of all time. After the release of Super Smash Bros. Ultimate, he established himself as one of the best players in the world. He has won one major Super Smash Bros. Ultimate tournament, Shine 2019, and was ranked as the second best Super Smash Bros. Ultimate player in the world in the Panda Global rankings for the second half of 2019.

In both Smash games, he primarily utilizes Princess Peach. In Wii U, he used Rosalina and Luma and Zero Suit Samus as secondary characters. As the second best Ultimate player, he mains Princess Peach, and uses Zero Suit Samus and Palutena as secondaries.

On April 3, 2021, Samsora was indefinitely banned by the Super Smash Bros. community due to his involvement with scandals related to former player Zack "CaptainZack" Lauth, particularly with CaptainZack's initiation with romantic partnerships that consisted of several adults which violated age of consent. Although Samsora was not accused of such a partnership, he was aware of parts of the facts and was banned for his perceived lack of transparency, logical inconsistency, and apathy towards the scandals.

Career

Super Smash Bros. for Wii U

Samsora's first major Super Smash Bros. result came at a Clutch City Clash, a regional tournament held in August 2016, where he eliminated reigning Evo 2016 champion Elliot "Ally" Carroza-Oyarce from the tournament before losing to Yuta "Abadango" Kawamura in the grand finals. In the Panda Global Rankings, considered the most authoritative ranking of Smash for Wii U players, Samsora debuted at 29th in the edition covering the second half of 2016, owing in part to his results at Clutch City Clash as well as top 17 placings at two major tournaments.

In January 2017 he took second in another minor tournament, Smash Conference LXIX, in what would wind up his highest placing in a tournament that year. While failing to secure a tournament win, Samsora placed highly in a number major Super Smash Bros. for Wii U tournaments in 2017, finishing tied for 5th at CEO Dreamland, tied for 33rd at Evo 2017, and tied for 9th at DreamHack Atlanta, among several other 7th and 9th-place results. He was ranked the 24th and 22nd best player in the Panda Global Rankings for the first and second half of 2017, respectively.

2018 was Samsora's most successful year in Super Smash Bros. for Wii U competition. He began the year taking third at the PAX Arena invitational at PAX South 2018. He would go on to make strong showings in several major tournaments; taking 7th at MomoCon 2018 and SwitchFest, 9th at Frostbite 2018, Get On My Level 2018, and 2GG: Hyrule Saga, and 17th at CEO 2018, all in the first half of the year. In addition, he won two minor tournaments, Saints Gaming Live 2018 and Denti's Bizarre Adventure 8. As a result of his strong performances, he jumped 10 places in the Panda Global Rankings, to 12th best in the world. In the second half of the year, Samsora took 7th at Low Tier City 6, 5th in DreamHack Atlanta 2018, and second in Super Smash Con 2018, where he lost to Leonardo "MkLeo" López Pérez. In December 2018, Panda Global released a ranking of the top 100 Smash for Wii U players from the game's release through the release of Super Smash Bros. Ultimate, which ranked Samsora 22nd.

Throughout Super Smash Bros. for Wii U, Samsora consistently used Princess Peach as his primary character. He occasionally used Rosalina and Luma, and more rarely Zero Suit Samus, as secondaries.

Super Smash Bros. Ultimate

Super Smash Bros. Ultimate was released in December 2018, and Samsora tied for 5th in one of its first tournaments, Let's Make Moves, held at the end of that month. Days later, multi-esport organization  announced that they had signed Samsora as their first Ultimate player. Samsora competed in eight of the eleven major tournaments held in the first half of 2019, finishing 2nd Smash 'N' Splash 5, 3rd at Genesis 6, and rounding out the results with two 4th-place finishes, a 5th-place finish, two 9th-place finishes, and a 13th-place finish. He also won a minor tournament, Kawaii Kon 2019. In the inaugural Panda Global Rankings Ultimate, Samsora ranked 4th behind MkLeo, Gavin "Tweek" Dempsey, and Tyler "Marss" Martins.

Samsora's results continued to improve going into the second half of the year. In July, he won the minor tournament Defend The North 2019. August was the most significant month of results in his career. At the beginning of the month he took 4th at Evo 2019, the largest offline tournament by number of participants in Smash Bros. franchise history. A week later he took 2nd at Super Smash Con 2019, defeating MkLeo in the winners' finals round before losing to him in the grand finals. At the end of the month, he won Shine 2019, again facing MkLeo in the grand finals and this time emerging victorious. Shine was his first premier-tier tournament win. Samsora took 2nd place at two other major tournaments in the months that followed, DreamHack Atlanta 2019 and Smash Ultimate Summit 2. In the second bi-annual ranking for Smash Ultimate, Samsora rose to 2nd place. Aside from one tournament where he finished tied for 13th, he took tied for 7th or better at every event he attended over the second half of the year.

In 2020, Samsora finished tied for 9th in one of the first tournaments of the year, Let's Make Big Moves, before winning the minor tournament Tampa Never Sleeps 8 later that month. At the end of January he took 3rd at Genesis 7, then tied for 13th at Frostbite 2020 the following month. Frostbite was the last major tournament held before Panda Global Rankings suspended the 2020 competitive season due to the COVID-19 pandemic. While CEO Dreamland 2020 no longer counted towards the rankings, the event still took place, though with a significant number of player cancellations. Samsora won the event, then donated a portion of his prize money back to the tournament organizer, who had announced that the tournament was in dire financial straits due to the loss of revenue from the cancellations. Due to the pandemic, most of the subsequent tournaments scheduled for the first half of the year were cancelled or moved online. Samsora entered the Hungrybox-organized The Box tournament in May, but finished outside the top 50.

As with Smash for Wii U, Samsora uses Princess Peach as his primary character. His secondary characters in Ultimate are Princess Daisy and Zero Suit Samus.

Ban from competitive play

In September 2020, someone claiming to be a friend (Tamim "tamim" Omary, formerly known as "Mistake") of Samsora, as well as CaptainZack, the minor who had been involved in sexual misconduct allegations against fellow pro Smash player Nairo, alleged that Zack was the one who initiated the relationship via non-consensual first contact while Nairo was asleep and requested the payments to stay silent, and that Samsora had pushed Zack into revealing the situation publicly for personal gain, with the friend stating that even though Samsora knew about the situation, he continued to collaborate with Nairo on several occasions until the information was revealed publicly, and that "Zack had been in relationships with many adults, and Samsora ha[d] never cared" then. It was unclear from the message posted as to whether Nairo continued the relationship with Zack following their first encounter or not, and if he did, whether it was of his own free will or because of the information Zack had on him. Samsora denied the allegations against him.

In March 2021, YouTuber "Technicals" posted a video based on investigative journalism that went over CaptainZack's scandals, particularly with Elliot "Ally" Bastien Carroza-Oyarce and Nairoby "Nairo" Quezada. In this video, he went over Samsora's and Saleem "Salem" Akiel Young's involvement with the scandals of CaptainZack. In relation to Samsora, he was consistently complicit with CaptainZack's behavior of initiating relationships with multiple adults in the community throughout Smash 4 and Ultimate as a minor. In addition, Samsora consistently spun the narrative of the story by appealing to the community throughout the aftermath of the scandals being revealed. For example, in September, he claimed that Nairo told his side of the scandal to him and Samsora concluded that Nairo's and Tamim's stories were hearsay. This is because no proof was revealed to the public that Nairo was innocent, and the community believed that CaptainZack was still the victim. However, in February 2021, when Nairo returned to streaming, he apologized to Nairo publicly and believed his side of the story due to the community believing Nairo much more than CaptainZack from Nairo's statements in October and February. As a result, Samsora was officially banned from the Super Smash Bros. community days after the video due to lack of transparency, being complicit in a crime, and being inconsistent with his side of the scandal. The ban was not publicly substantiated due to the complexity of the case. In a follow-up video by "Technicals", he claimed that the community banned Samsora because of the public's perception of Samsora after the video. "Technicals" claimed that the community was silent for Samsora and loud against Salem. This is indicated by Salem's ban prior to the video and the community's dislike for Salem, whereas Samsora did not receive a ban and was loved by the community. Despite this coincidence, the community panel claimed that Samsora's involvement with the scandals were being worked on since October. The community denied these claims due to their negative perception and disassociation with "Technicals."

Personal life

Samsora was born in Louisiana. He grew up in New Orleans in a family that embraced playing video games, and his mother has always supported his desire to compete in Super Smash Bros. He is currently based out of South Florida, where he is pursuing a business degree at Broward College part-time while competing. The name he competes under, Samsora, is inspired by a character from the game Grand Chase named Samsara. He subsequently legally changed his name to Ezra Samsora Morris.

He gravitated towards Princess Peach because he enjoyed her float mechanic as well as the concept of "being able to kick butt as a princess".

References

External links
 

Super Smash Bros. Ultimate players
American esports players
People from Louisiana
Living people
Broward College alumni
Super Smash Bros. for Wii U players
Year of birth missing (living people)